St Paul's Church is a church building of the Presbyterian Church of Scotland in the Scottish town of Milngavie in East Dunbartonshire, near Glasgow. It is at the junction of Glasgow Road  which carries the A81 through the city, and Baldernock Road. In 1978, St Paul's Church was listed as a Category C monument in Scotland. The church is still in use today.

History 

In 1787 members of the New Kilpatrick Parish Church in Bearsden (then known as Newkirk) broke from the Established Church. Permission was sought from the Relief Church in Glasgow. Thus, in 1788, the Kilpatrick Relief Church was established. Initially open-air services were held on Barloch Moor in a hollow beside the Tannoch Burn known as the "preaching braes". A church was finally built on the Barloch Estate, finished in 1799 at a cost of £500.

After several mergers within the church and the constantly growing congregation, the construction of new church buildings became necessary at the end of the 19th century. First, in 1903, the Cairns Church (named after John Cairns) was completed. In 1903, a competition was held prior to the construction of St Paul's Church; a design by the Edinburgh architectural practice Leadbetter & Fairley won the competition. Violet Graham, Duchess of Montrose laid the memorial stone on 20 May 1905. The church was opened on 12 January 1906.

With the reintegration of most of the United Free Church of Scotland into the Church of Scotland in 1929, the parish of Milngavie was divided into three parishes. Although St Paul's Church was the largest building, it became the parish church of the smallest and most sparsely populated parish. Over the decades, the building has been constantly renovated. The original bell tower no longer exists.

Building description 

When completed, the building was considered the finest church building in the Dumbarton area. The structure is made of roughly hewn red sandstone. The transept has, unusually, two gables on each side. The window design is based on late Gothic architecture.

References

External links 
 

Milngavie
Category C listed buildings in East Dunbartonshire
Churches completed in 1906
Listed churches in Scotland